Murmashi is an urban locality (an urban-type settlement) in Kolsky District of Murmansk Oblast, Russia, located on the Kola Peninsula on the lower Tuloma River,  southwest of Murmansk. Population: 

It was founded as a work settlement around 1930.

The Murmansk Airport is located near Murmashi.

References

Urban-type settlements in Murmansk Oblast
Kolsky District